Robert Morrison Olyphant (September9, 1824May3, 1918) was an American businessman active in New York City and China in the late 19th century. He served as president of the Delaware and Hudson Railroad for 20 years.

Life and career 
Olyphant was born on September 9, 1824 in Manhattan, New York City to David Olyphant and Ann Archer (McKenzie) Olyphant. After graduating from Columbia College in 1842, he entered his father's firm, Olyphant & Co., in 1842. Olyphant was named for the Scottish missionary Robert Morrison, who was a friend of his father from Canton (now Guangzhou), China.

Olyphant was in China between 18441845 and later, from 1858, reorganized Olyphant and Co. in Canton. He retired from the China trade in 1873. On his return from China, he was appointed to the Board of Managers of the Delaware and Hudson Canal Company (later the Delaware and Hudson Railroad) and subsequently served as the company's Assistant President and Vice President followed by a twenty-year stint as President.

He died on May 3, 1918 at his home at 160 West Fifty-ninth Street in Manhattan, New York City.

Olyphant is the great-great-grandfather of actor Timothy Olyphant.

References 

1824 births
1918 deaths
People from Manhattan
Robert Morrison
American people of Scottish descent
Columbia College (New York) alumni
19th-century American businesspeople